Black Tight Killers is the first extended play by the Japanese punk rock band 54 Nude Honeys, released on January 12, 2001, by Vinyl Japan. The EP is a split with the English punk rock band The Diaboliks. It is the 54 Nude Honeys' only EP. The title of the EP comes from a 1966 Japanese film, Black Tight Killers.

Track listing

References

2001 EPs
Split EPs
54 Nude Honeys albums